Moksokh is a rural locality (a selo) in Balakhansky Selsoviet, Untsukulsky District, Republic of Dagestan, Russia. The population was 219 as of 2010.

Geography 
Moksokh is located 26 km southwest of Shamilkala (the district's administrative centre) by road. Kharachi is the nearest rural locality.

References 

Rural localities in Untsukulsky District